Rivadavia Department is a department of Argentina in Santiago del Estero Province. The capital city of the department is situated in Selva.

References

Departments of Santiago del Estero Province